Inner Constance  is a summit of the Olympic Mountains and is located in Jefferson County of Washington state. It's located near the eastern edge of Olympic National Park on the Olympic Peninsula. Its nearest higher neighbor is Mount Constance,  to the east. Within this nearly mile-wide separation resides a deep glacially carved canyon called "Avalanche Canyon". Precipitation runoff on the north side of the peak drains into tributaries of the Dungeness River, whereas the south side drains into tributaries of the Dosewallips River.

Climate
Inner Constance is located in the eastern portion of the Olympic Mountains. This location results in less precipitation than Mount Olympus and the western Olympics receive. Inner Constance is located in the marine west coast climate zone of western North America. Most weather fronts originate in the Pacific Ocean, and travel northeast toward the Olympic Mountains. As fronts approach, they are forced upward by the peaks of the Olympic Range, causing them to drop their moisture in the form of rain or snowfall (Orographic lift). As a result, the Olympics experience high precipitation, especially during the winter months in the form of snowfall. During winter months, weather is usually cloudy, but, due to high pressure systems over the Pacific Ocean that intensify during summer months, there is often little or no cloud cover during the summer. Because of maritime influence, snow tends to be wet and heavy, resulting in high avalanche danger.

Geology

The Olympic Mountains are composed of obducted clastic wedge material and oceanic crust, primarily Eocene sandstone, turbidite, and basaltic oceanic crust. The mountains were sculpted during the Pleistocene era by erosion and glaciers advancing and retreating multiple times.

See also

 Olympic Mountains
 Geology of the Pacific Northwest
 Geography of Washington (state)

References

External links
 

Mountains of Washington (state)
Olympic Mountains
Mountains of Jefferson County, Washington
Landforms of Olympic National Park
North American 2000 m summits